The Plot: A Novel is a work of fiction written by Jean Hanff Korelitz. The book was published in May, 2021 by Celadon Books. The story is a mystery-thriller.

Plot
In the past, Jacob Finch Bonner wrote a reasonably successful novel. But he was unable to produce anything fruitful after that. Now, Bonner is a has-been and he knows it. He is also a Professor in a shabby Vermont MFA program. One day, Bonner appropriates a story-idea developed by one of his students, now deceased. While alive, the student bragged that the plot (story idea) is a guaranteed best seller. So, upon learning of the student's death, Bonner uses the essentials of the student's plot to write his new book. In the novel, the book that Bonner writes is entitled Crib. World-wide success and accolades pour down on him. Then at the pinnacle of all the adulation, Bonner receives an anonymous email claiming he is a thief. Hence, Elizabeth Egan of the New York Times writes: "And if you’re a reader who likes stories where a terrible decision snowballs out of control, this book is just what the librarian ordered. Welcome to a spectacular avalanche."

Reception
This novel has been well received:

Elizabeth Egan of the New York Times says: "...I will say that I think ‘The Plot’ is [Korelitz’s] gutsiest, most consequential book yet. It keeps you guessing and wondering, and also keeps you thinking...[the] weighty questions mingle with a love story, a mystery and a striver’s journey — three of the most satisfying flavors of fiction out there."

Maureen Corrigan of the Washington Post writes: "The plot of 'The Plot' is so ingenious that it should be assigned as required reading in the very MFA programs it pinions, both as a model of superior narrative construction and as a warning of the grim realities of the literary life to naïve wannabe writers.' "(qtd. in Book Marks) 

Tom Nolan of the Wall Street Journal writes: " Ms. Korelitz’s book deftly intersperses chapters from “Crib,” and it becomes a struggle for Jake to separate his own fiction from the real-life events he believes inspired Evan’s tale. “The Plot” is wickedly funny and chillingly grim, and like the novel Evan hoped to create, it deserves to garner all the brass rings.

Judith Reveal reviewing for the New York Journal of Books says: "Korelitz tends to write heavy in narrative with an abundance of parenthetical asides that don’t seem to be entirely necessary. That said, however, she lays out a strong story without distractions, and the reader easily turns the page to learn what happens next. To say the end of the story is a real twist would be a huge understatement..."

Bethanne Patrick reviewing this book for NPR says that one of most enjoyable things in the novel "is the [early] encounter between Jacob Finch Bonner and his student Evan Parker... these two...white male writers have brief literary fisticuffs during a class..." And, Patrick later writes: "It might be, from a writer of Korelitz's talent, that I wanted and expected a more fiendish and psychologically driven book. Instead, this Plot falls flat.

Adaptation
In January 2022, Onyx Collective won a bidding war for rights to a TV series adapted by showrunner Abby Ajayi based on the novel, planning to release it on Hulu. HBO was said to be a contender in the bidding war, but dropped out later. The series stars Mahershala Ali, who also executive produces under his Know Wonder banner alongside Endeavor Content.

References

External links
 
 
 Author's website. September 9, 2021
 Jean Hanff Korelitz is interviewed by Jimmy Fallon. Tonight Show. Video. YouTube. 
An excerpt of 
"A Desperate Writer Steals 'The Plot' ". 
The Guardian newspaper (online) interview: Jean Hanff Korelitz.

2021 American novels
Novels set in Vermont
Novels set in Georgia (U.S. state)
American mystery novels
American thriller novels
Novels about writers